The Offences at Sea Act 1799 (39 Geo 3 c 37) is an Act of the Parliament of Great Britain. It is still in force. It extended the jurisdiction of British courts to crimes committed by British subjects on the high seas. It does not apply to foreign citizens. (However crimes committed by foreigners in British territorial waters, or on board British ships on the high seas, can be prosecuted in British courts.) Jurisdiction over piracy on the high seas already existed before 1799, whether committed by British subjects or not.

This Act appears to determine the sentence for piracy iure gentium in cases where section 2 of the Piracy Act 1837 does not apply.

Provisions

Preamble
The preamble was repealed by Part I of Schedule 3 to the Criminal Law Act 1967.

Section 1
This section now reads:

The words "of the same nature respectively, and to be" and the words from "and shall be inquired of" onwards were repealed by Part I of Schedule 3 to the Criminal Law Act 1967.

Section 2
This section was repealed by Part I of Schedule 3 to the Criminal Law Act 1967.

See also
Offences at Sea Act
Territorial Waters Jurisdiction Act 1878
Piracy Act 1837

References

English criminal law
Great Britain Acts of Parliament 1799 
Water transport in the United Kingdom
Piracy law